Daniel Babor (born 22 October 1999) is a Czech professional racing cyclist, who currently rides for UCI ProTeam . He rode in the men's scratch event at the 2020 UCI Track Cycling World Championships in Berlin, Germany.

Major results

Road
2017
 1st Stages 1 & 2b Internationale Cottbuser Junioren-Etappenfahrt
2020
 3rd Road race, National Under-23 Road Championships
 8th Puchar Ministra Obrony Narodowej
2021
 1st  Road race, National Under-23 Road Championships
 1st Stage 4 Tour of Romania
2022
 1st Stages 2 & 5 Tour of Romania
 Tour du Loir-et-Cher
 Points classification
1st Stage 1
 3rd Grand Prix Wyszków
 3rd GP Gorenjska
 7th Grand Prix Poland
 7th Ronde van de Achterhoek
2023
 8th Trofeo Palma

Track

2016
 National Junior Track Championships
1st  Individual pursuit
1st  Team pursuit (with Vaclav Kocarík, Tomáš Bárta & Jan Cink)
1st  Points Race
1st  Scratch
1st  Omnium
 2nd  Scratch, UCI World Junior Track Championships
2017
 1st  Scratch, UCI World Junior Track Championships
 UEC European Junior Track Championships
1st  Scratch
2nd  Madison
 National Junior Track Championships
1st  Individual pursuit
1st  Points Race
1st  Scratch
2018
 National Track Championships
1st  Madison (with Luděk Lichnovský)
1st  Omnium
2019
 2nd  Scratch, UEC European Under-23 Track Championships
2020
 National Track Championships
1st  Madison (with René Smekal)
1st  Omnium
2021
 National Track Championships
1st  Points race
1st  Omnium
1st  Elimination race
 UEC European Under-23 Track Championships
3rd  Scratch
3rd  Omnium

References

External links
 

1999 births
Living people
Czech male cyclists
People from Beroun
Sportspeople from the Central Bohemian Region